Mumbhai Connection is a 2011 Hindi-language film shot entirely in Atlanta, USA. The film was set to release theatrically in August 2014 It is directed by Atlanta Nagendra, who also wrote the screenplay.

It is produced by Abbas Moloo, Nawal Parwal, Sathya Narayanan and Rafiq Batcha. The music director is Praveen Duth Stephen.

Synopsis 
An Indian salesman, Faisal, joins an Atlanta IT company only to learn that it is run by the Mumbai mafia. Worse, he is forced to sell IT services to the Atlanta mafia. Even worse, they are not buying! Now Faisal's life is on the line and the only way he can get out alive is by going boldly where no salesman has gone before.

Cast 
 Rafiq Batcha ... Faisal Khan
 Srinivas ... Kal
 Dick Mays ... Gambino
 Alieesa P. Badresia ... Tara
 Chrissy Chambers ... Angela
 Eli Jones ... Igor
 David Peirce ... Vinny

Release
Mumbhai Connection has been shown at the following film festivals.
 7th Atlanta Asian Film Festival 2011
 Third World Indie Film Festival 2011
 8th Dixie Film Festival Atlanta 2011
 10th Urban Mediamakers Film Festival2011
 2nd Bronze Lens Film Festival 2011
 4th Bengaluru International Film Festival 2011
 7th Annual Macon Film Festival 2012
 South Asian Film Festival 2012

Accolades
 Winner – Best Comedy Third World Indie Film Festival 2011
 Winner – Best Comedy 7th Atlanta Asian Film Festival 2011
 Winner – Best Key Art Design 10th Urban Mediamakers Film Festival 2011
 Winner – 3rd Best Film in Feature Film Category 10th Urban Mediamakers Film Festival 2011

References

External links
 
 
 Mumbhai Connection | India Currents

2011 films